Luxembourg nationality law is ruled by the Constitution of Luxembourg. The Grand Duchy of Luxembourg is a member state of the European Union and, therefore, its citizens are also EU citizens.

Nationality by birth
Luxembourg law generally follows jus sanguinis with limited jus soli provisions. Citizenship is automatically given to:
 a child of a Luxembourg citizen parent, regardless of the place of birth;
 a child born in Luxembourg to a parent born in Luxembourg (even if the parent is not a Luxembourg citizen); or
 a child born in Luxembourg to parents who are stateless or unable to pass their nationality onto their child; or
 a child born in Luxembourg to unknown parents.
 Furthermore, a child born in Luxembourg to foreign parents, neither of whom were born in Luxembourg, gains Luxembourg citizenship automatically upon turning 18 years old if:
 at least one of their parents lived continuously in Luxembourg in the 12 months preceding their birth; and
 they have lived continuously in Luxembourg in the 5 years immediately preceding their 18th birthday.

Naturalization
Naturalization is permitted, subject to the following conditions:
 being at least eighteen years old;
 five years of legal residence in the Grand Duchy, including an uninterrupted period of one year immediately before applying for citizenship;
 passing a Luxembourgish language exam;
 taking a course on "living together in the Grand Duchy" or passing the associated examination; and
 never having been handed an immediate custodial sentence of 12 months or more or a suspended custodial sentence of 24 months or more, in any country.

Acquisition of nationality by option
Luxembourg law also provides for the possibility to acquire nationality by option, which is a separate legal concept from naturalization.

Obtaining nationality by option is permitted in the following ten cases:
 Adults with a parent (biological or adopted) or grandparent who is/was a Luxembourger and was unable to pass Luxembourg nationality to the person at birth (e.g. due to the nationality laws of another country forbidding it);
 Parents of Luxembourg minors (requires 5 years' residency and passing the Luxembourgish language and integration exams);
 Persons who are married to a Luxembourg citizen (requires passing the Luxembourgish language and integration exams; no minimum residency or marriage length requirement for spouses living in Luxembourg; 3 years' marriage required for spouses living outside Luxembourg);
 Persons aged 12 or above who were born in Luxembourg and did not automatically become a citizen at birth due to neither of their parents being Luxembourg citizens or born in Luxembourg (requires 5 years' residency and for at least one parent to have lived continuously in Luxembourg for at least 12 months immediately prior to the person's birth);
 Adults who have completed at least 7 years' schooling in Luxembourg (requires 12 months' residency immediately prior to the citizenship application);
 Adults who have legally resided in Luxembourg for at least 20 years (requires 12 months' residency immediately prior to the citizenship application and a total of 24 hours' attendance at a Luxembourgish language course, but no requirement to pass the language exam);
 Adults who have fulfilled the obligations of the Welcome and Integration Contract (Contrat d'accueil et d'intégration), a free, optional course available to any foreigner living in Luxembourg (also requires 5 years' residency and passing the Luxembourgish language and integration exams);
 Adults who settled in Luxembourg before turning 18 (requires 5 years' residency and passing the Luxembourgish language and integration exams);
 Adults who are stateless, refugees or have subsidiary protection status (requires 5 years' residency and passing the Luxembourgish language and integration exams); or
 Volunteer soldiers who have completed one year of good and loyal service, as certified by the Luxembourg Army's Chief of Staff.

All of the options also have the same "good repute" requirements as for naturalisation, i.e. the applicant must never have been handed an immediate custodial sentence of 12 months or more or a suspended custodial sentence of 24 months or more, in any country.

Recovery of citizenship

It is also possible to "recover" or "reclaim" Luxembourg nationality if a person can prove that they have an ancestor who was a Luxembourg citizen as of 1 January 1900. The Luxembourg diaspora at the time moved to France, Belgium and the USA. By the end of 2013, thousands of people had recovered the nationality of their Luxembourg ancestor. In 2021, 6,801 people claimed citizenship, in 2020, it was 9,389 and in total 31,151 people have claimed citizenship since the passing of the 2008 law. The final deadline to reclaim citizenship was moved to December 31, 2022 because of the Covid-19 Pandemic.

Loss of nationality 
A Luxembourg citizen aged 18 or over may renounce their citizenship at any time, free of charge, provided that doing so would not render them stateless.

A Luxembourg citizen who became such by naturalization, option or recovery may be stripped of their citizenship if it emerges that they obtained it by making false statements or through a marriage of convenience, provided that such an action would not render them stateless.

Dual citizenship
Since 1 January 2009, Luxembourg has allowed dual citizenship. Since then, many Belgians have made use of the new law to adopt Belgian-Luxembourg citizenship, especially Belgians living in Arelerland, a part of the Belgian province of Luxembourg at the border with the Grand Duchy.

Citizenship of the European Union
Because Luxembourg forms part of the European Union, Luxembourg citizens are also citizens of the European Union under European Union law and thus enjoy rights of free movement and have the right to vote in elections for the European Parliament. When in a non-EU country where there is no Luxembourg embassy, Luxembourg citizens have the right to get consular protection from the embassy of any other EU country present in that country. Luxembourgish citizens can live and work in any country within the EU as a result of the right of free movement and residence granted in Article 21 of the EU Treaty.

Travel freedom of Luxembourg citizens

Visa requirements for Luxembourg citizens are administrative entry restrictions by the authorities of other states placed on citizens of Luxembourg. In 2015, Luxembourg citizens had visa-free or visa-on-arrival access to 171 countries and territories, ranking the Luxembourg passport 3rd in the world according to the Visa Restrictions Index.

In 2017, Luxembourg nationality is ranked sixteenth in Nationality Index (QNI). This index differs from the Visa Restrictions Index, which focuses on external factors including travel freedom. The QNI considers, in addition, to travel freedom on internal factors such as peace & stability, economic strength, and human development as well.

References

External links
  Luxembourg's Ministry of Justice website
  About the new nationality law

See also
 Luxembourgish passport

Nationality law
Law of Luxembourg
Luxembourg and the European Union